Rullac-Saint-Cirq is a commune in the Aveyron department in southern France.

Population

Geography
The river Céor forms part of the commune's northern border.

See also
Communes of the Aveyron department

References

Communes of Aveyron
Aveyron communes articles needing translation from French Wikipedia